Phasor is a phase vector representing a sine wave.

Phasor may also be:

 Phasor (sound synthesizer), a stereo music, sound and speech synthesizer for the Apple II computer
 Phasor measurement unit, a device that measures phasors on an electricity grid
 Phasor (radio broadcasting), a network of inductors and capacitors used to control the relative amplitude and phase of the radio frequency currents driving a directional antenna array.

See also

Phase (disambiguation)
Phaser (disambiguation)
FASOR (disambiguation)